Kampong Cham is the capital city of Kampong Cham Province in eastern Cambodia. It is the 12th largest city in Cambodia with a population of 61,750 people (2021) and is located on the Mekong River.  Kampong Cham is 124 kilometers northeast from Phnom Penh and can be reached by either boat or by asphalt road. It takes about 2.5 hours by vehicle or 2.5 hours by boat from Phnom Penh to the city of Kampong Cham.

The city is connected to the district of Tbong khmum by the Kizuna bridge, the first in Cambodia to span the Mekong.

Administrative division 
The city is subdivided into four sangkats and 32 villages.

Politic 
The indirect election of city council in 2014 give the presidentship to CPP which has won 11 out of the 15 seats in the city council. The rest were won by CNRP.

Sport 
Kampong Cham has a great outdoor Olympic size 50 meter swimming pool with 5 and 10 meter diving boards. As of January 2020 the entry cost was $2 USD.
There is a swim club, coached by Japanese volunteers.

Climate 
The city has a tropical climate. When compared with winter, the summers have much more rainfall. This location is classified as Aw by Köppen and Geiger. The average annual temperature in Kampong Cham is 27.7 °C. Precipitation here averages 1721 mm.

See also
 Cham people
 Cham language

References

External links

Provincial capitals in Cambodia
Cities in Cambodia
Populated places in Kampong Cham province